Mohamed Adan Khalif  current Governor of Mandera county,  was former Speak er of the Mandera County Assembly who served as Mandera Township councillor (1998–2013), former Mayor Mandera Town Council and as chairman of the local town council

Biography

Career

References

See also
https://mak2022.co.ke/
Mandera County Government

1975 births
Living people
People from Mandera County
United Democratic Movement (Kenya) politicians
County Governors of Kenya
Kenyan people of Somali descent